Bejou is a city in Mahnomen County, Minnesota, United States. The population was 89 at the 2010 census. It is contained wholly within the White Earth Reservation.

History
A post office called Bejou has been in operation since 1906. Some sources state that the town got its name from a corruption of the French word Bonjour, reasoning that the name is related to the Ojibwe word Boozhoo. However, these two words are linguistic false friends, and are not etymologically related. The town's name likely comes from the Ojibwe word bizhiw meaning "Lynx", a type of cat indigenous to North America, and one of the doodems of the Ojibwe people.

Geography

Demographics

2010 census
As of the census of 2010, there were 89 people, 37 households, and 21 families residing in the city. The racial makeup of the city was 76.4% White, 18.0% Native American, 1.1% Asian, and 4.5% from two or more races.

There were 37 households, of which 18.9% had children under the age of 18 living with them, 40.5% were married couples living together, 8.1% had a female householder with no husband present, 8.1% had a male householder with no wife present, and 43.2% were non-families. 37.8% of all households were made up of individuals, and 10.8% had someone living alone who was 65 years of age or older. The average household size was 2.41 and the average family size was 3.24.

The median age in the city was 45.5 years. 22.5% of residents were under the age of 18; 7.9% were between the ages of 18 and 24; 17.9% were from 25 to 44; 38.1% were from 45 to 64; and 13.5% were 65 years of age or older. The gender makeup of the city was 52.8% male and 47.2% female.

2000 census
As of the census of 2000, there were 94 people, 36 households, and 24 families residing in the city. The racial makeup of the city was 82.98% White, 10.64% Native American, and 6.38% from two or more races.

There were 36 households, out of which 36.1% had children under the age of 18 living with them, 58.3% were married couples living together, 8.3% had a female householder with no husband present, and 30.6% were non-families. 30.6% of all households were made up of individuals, and 19.4% had someone living alone who was 65 years of age or older. The average household size was 2.61 and the average family size was 3.28.

In the city, the population was spread out, with 29.8% under the age of 18, 7.4% from 18 to 24, 29.8% from 25 to 44, 18.1% from 45 to 64, and 14.9% who were 65 years of age or older. The median age was 36 years. For every 100 females, there were 123.8 males. For every 100 females age 18 and over, there were 112.9 males.

The median income for a household in the city was $32,750, and the median income for a family was $33,281. Males had a median income of $26,250 versus $9,688 for females. The per capita income for the city was $10,210. There were 13.8% of families and 12.0% of the population living below the poverty line, including 11.4% of under eighteens and 28.6% of those over 64.

References

Cities in Minnesota
Cities in Mahnomen County, Minnesota